Stanchev is a Bulgarian masculine surname, its feminine counterpart is Stancheva. It may refer to

Denislav Stanchev (born 2000), Bulgarian football midfielder 
Dina Stancheva (born 1925), Bulgarian architect
Galina Stancheva, Bulgarian volleyball player 
Georgi Stanchev (born 1985), Bulgarian football striker
Kameliya Stancheva, Antarctic explorer
Stancheva Peak in Antarctic, named after Kameliya
Kiril Stanchev (1895–1968), Bulgarian general
Kremena Stancheva (1941–2013), Bulgarian folk singer
Lachezar Stanchev (1908–1992), Bulgarian poet 
Magdalina Stancheva (1924–2014), Bulgarian archaeologist and museologist
Malina Stancheva (born 1967), Bulgarian pop-folk singer
Marian Stanchev (born 1988), Bulgarian football defender
Nayden Stanchev (born 1949), Bulgarian boxer
Nikola Stanchev (1930–2009), Bulgarian freestyle wrestler 
Nikolay Stanchev (born 1980), Bulgarian track cyclist
Stancho Stanchev, Bulgarian theatre director
Stefan Stanchev (born 1989), Bulgarian footballer 
Todor Stanchev (1921–2002), Bulgarian sports shooter
Tsvetanka Stancheva (born 1929), Bulgarian gymnast
Valentin Stanchev (born 1968), Bulgarian football striker
Vasilka Stancheva (born 1929), Bulgarian gymnast 

Bulgarian-language surnames